Ranada Prasad Shaha University is a private University in Narayanganj Bangladesh. It was the first Private University in Narayanganj. Officially recognized by the University Grants Commission of Bangladesh. RPSU is a coeducational Bangladeshi higher education institution and offers courses and programs leading to officially recognized higher education degrees in several areas of study.

History 
Ranada Prasad Shaha University (RPSU) is a unit of Kumudini Welfare Trust of Bengal Ltd. It' Founded in 2013. This university is named after Sri Ranada Prasad Saha, a famous philanthropist and businessman who was killed during the liberation war of Bangladesh in 1971.

References 

Educational institutions established in 2013
2013 establishments in Bangladesh
Private universities in Bangladesh